Bakhcha (Baqsa) is a rural locality (a village) in Nureyevsky Selsoviet, Sharansky District, Bashkortostan, Russia. The population was 46 as of 2010. There is 1 street.

Geography 
Bakhcha is located 30 km east of Sharan (the district's administrative centre) by road. Yenakhmetovo is the nearest rural locality.

References 

Rural localities in Sharansky District